Kid, Huwag Kang Susuko is a 1987 Philippine martial arts drama film directed by Peque Gallaga and Lore Reyes. The film stars Richard Gomez as the title role. The film is a Philippine rendition of the 1984 movie The Karate Kid.

Cast
 Richard Gomez as Cesar "Sawie" Arroyo
 Nida Blanca as Aling Turing
 Mark Gil as Wyrlo
 Rachel Ann Wolfe as Ogie
 Mel Martinez as Pongkee
 Peewee Quijano as Shado
 Jang Hwan Kim as Mr. Tan
 Romy Romulo as Coach Alegre
 Sammy Brillante as Durano
 Bernard Cañaberal as Genevie
 E.R. Ejercito as Mano
 Bobby Reyes as Hapon
 Crispin Medina as Tournament Referee

Awards

References

External links

1987 films
Filipino-language films
Philippine martial arts films
Philippine sports drama films
Regal Entertainment films
Films directed by Peque Gallaga